The Ministry of Industry and Advanced Technology (MoIAT) is a government ministry in the United Arab Emirates that is responsible for overseeing and strengthening the country's industrial sector. Established in July 2020 against the backdrop of the COVID-19 pandemic, the ministry drafts nation-wide policies, laws and programs to create industrial development framework that helps attract foreign direct investment and support national entrepreneurship as well as drive job creation.

References 

Politics of the United Arab Emirates
Government agencies of the United Arab Emirates